IJsselmonde is a borough in the southeastern corner of the city of Rotterdam, Netherlands. As of 2006 it has 58,782 inhabitants.

The name IJsselmonde is also used to denote the island in the Rhine–Meuse–Scheldt delta bordered by the Nieuwe Maas to the north, the Oude Maas to the south, and the Noord to the east. The borough is in the island. IJssel in the name IJsselmonde refers this island's location at the mouth of the Hollandse IJssel.

Politics
IJsselmonde is a stronghold of livable Rotterdam who wins every polling station.

Notable people
Paul de Leeuw was born in IJsselmonde.

References

Boroughs of Rotterdam